Larry Lee Willis (born July 18, 1949) is a former American football safety in the National Football League for the Washington Redskins.  He played college football at the University of Texas-El Paso.

1948 births
Living people
American football safeties
Washington Redskins players
Players of American football from Phoenix, Arizona
UTEP Miners football players